The Redmont Garden Apartments is a historic complex of four buildings in Mountain Brook, Alabama. It was built by the B. L. Jackson Company with a mortgage from the New York Life Insurance Company supported by the Federal Housing Administration. Construction began in 1938, and it was completed in 1939.

The buildings were designed by architect Raymond C. Snow in the Colonial Revival style. It has been listed on the National Register of Historic Places since August 5, 1993.

References

Buildings and structures on the National Register of Historic Places in Alabama		
National Register of Historic Places in Jefferson County, Alabama
Colonial Revival architecture in Alabama
Residential buildings completed in 1939
1939 establishments in Alabama
Mountain Brook, Alabama